Chizuru Sasaki (Kanji:, born 2 December 1985) is a Japanese sports shooter. She competed in the women's 10 metre air pistol event at the 2020 Summer Olympics.

References

External links
 

1985 births
Living people
Japanese female sport shooters
Olympic shooters of Japan
Shooters at the 2020 Summer Olympics
People from Morioka, Iwate
Sportspeople from Iwate Prefecture